Machaerilaemus is a genus of lice belonging to the family Menoponidae.

The species of this genus are found in Europe and Northern America.

Selected species:
 Machaerilaemus americanus (Ewing, 1930) 
 Machaerilaemus clayae (Balat, 1966) 
 Machaerilaemus malleus (Burmeister, 1838)

References

Lice